Karadere is a Turkic word meaning "black creek" and may refer to

Karadere, Anamur, a village in Anamur district of Mersin Province, Turkey
Karadere, Aydıncık, a village in Aydıncık district of Mersin Province, Turkey
Karadere, Burhaniye
Karadere river, that empties into the Black Sea 20 miles east of Trabzon, Turkey
Karadere, Fethiye, a town in Fethiye district of Muğla Province, Turkey
Karadere, Gündoğmuş, a village in Gündoğmuş district of Antalya Province, Turkey
Qaradere, a village in Zangilan Rayon, Azerbaijan

Surname
Nagihan Karadere (born 1984), Turkish female sprint runner

Other uses
Karadere Dam, a dam in Kastamonu Province, Turkey

See also
Akdere (disambiguation)

Turkish-language surnames